Brandon Nakashima (born August 3, 2001) is an American professional tennis player. He has been ranked as high as world No. 43 in singles by the Association of Tennis Professionals (ATP), which he achieved on 17 October 2022. On the same day, he also reached a career-high doubles ranking of No. 316.

After graduating from High Bluff Academy in Rancho Santa Fe, he enrolled at the University of Virginia to play collegiate tennis, but chose to forgo his remaining years of eligibility after his first year. He has won one ATP singles title, as well as the 2022 Next Generation ATP Finals.

Junior career 
As a junior, Nakashima was ranked as high as No. 3 in the world. In 2018, he won two titles on the International Tennis Federation (ITF) junior circuit and went on to win that year's ITF Junior Masters, the year-end tournament for the top-ranked junior singles players

Collegiate career

Nakashima graduated from high school, High Bluff Academy in San Diego, a semester early, before enrolling at the University of Virginia in January 2019 at the age of 17. During his time at UVA, he finished the season with a 17–5 record in singles and 20–3 record in doubles. At the end of the season he received the ACC-Freshman of the Year and All-ACC First Team awards and was also a part of the All-ACC Academic Team. After one semester he decided to forgo his remaining years of eligibility and turn professional.

Professional career

2020: First ATP main draw, Grand Slam debut
In February 2020, Nakashima received a wildcard into the Delray Beach Open (his first ATP main draw event), where he reached the quarterfinals, defeating Jiří Veselý and Cameron Norrie before falling to Yoshihito Nishioka.

Later in the year at the US Open (his Grand Slam main draw debut as a wildcard), Nakashima defeated Paolo Lorenzi before being beaten by 5th seed and eventual runner-up, Alexander Zverev.

2021: First two tour finals, Next Gen ATP Finals, Top 70 debut

Nakashima qualified into a Grand Slam main draw for the first time at Wimbledon. He lost in the first round to compatriot and 31st seed, Taylor Fritz.

Nakashima reached his first final in Los Cabos, where after beating J. J. Wolf, 4th seed Sam Querrey, 5th seed Jordan Thompson (after saving 3 match points), and 2nd seed John Isner, he lost to 1st seed Cameron Norrie in the final. From this run, the 19-year-old Nakashima became the youngest American to reach an ATP final since a then 18-year-old Taylor Fritz got to the final of the Memphis Open in 2016.

A week later in Atlanta, Nakashima reached his second final in as many weeks but lost to 6th seed John Isner in the championship match. As a result of this good run, Nakashima cracked the top 100 for the first time, coming in at world No. 89 on August 2, 2021, a day before his 20th birthday.

As a qualifier at the 2021 European Open, he reached the quarterfinals where he lost to Diego Schwartzman. As a result, he reached a new career-high ranking of No. 70 on October 25, 2021.

Nakashima qualified for the 2021 Next Generation ATP Finals as the fourth seed in recognition of his breakout success in the year among players aged 21 and under. In his group, he notched wins against Juan Manuel Cerúndolo and Holger Rune, taking him to the semifinals, before he lost to eventual finalist Sebastian Korda in five sets. He ended the year at a career-high of No. 62 and was nominated ATP Newcomer of the Year.

2022: Major fourth round, Top 50, Maiden title, Next Gen Champion
At the 2022 French Open, Nakashima reached the third round of a Grand Slam for the first time, where he lost to 3rd seed Alexander Zverev.

At the 2022 Wimbledon Championships, he reached the fourth round of a Major for the first time in his career defeating Daniel Elahi Galán. He lost a tight five-set contest to eventual runner-up Nick Kyrgios. He reached the top 50 on 11 July 2022 at world No. 49.

Seeded fifth at his home tournament, the 2022 San Diego Open, he reached his third ATP final after defeating Christopher O'Connell. In the final, he defeated Marcos Giron to win his first career title. He qualified for the 2022 Next Generation ATP Finals and won the title undefeated after beating Jack Draper in the semifinal and Jiří Lehečka in the final.

World TeamTennis
Nakashima made his World TeamTennis debut in 2020 with the Chicago Smash for their inaugural season.

Nakashima excelled in singles play for the Smash and also paired up with Rajeev Ram throughout the season in men's doubles to help Chicago earn a No. 2 seed in WTT Playoffs. The Smash defeated the Orlando Storm to earn a spot in the final, but ultimately fell to the New York Empire in a Supertiebreaker.

Personal life
Nakashima's father is a Japanese American born in California, while his mother was born in Vietnam and moved to California at age 5.

Performance timeline

Singles
Current through the 2023 BNP Paribas Open.

ATP career finals

Singles: 3 (1 title, 2 runner-ups)

ATP Next Generation finals

Singles: 1 (1 title)

ATP Challenger and ITF Futures finals

Singles: 5 (5–0)

Doubles: 1 (0–1)

Record against other players

Record against top 10 players
Nakashima's record against players who have been ranked in the top 10, with those who are active in boldface. Only ATP Tour main draw matches are considered:

References

External links
 
 

2001 births
Living people
American male tennis players
American sportspeople of Japanese descent
American sportspeople of Vietnamese descent
Virginia Cavaliers men's tennis players
Tennis players from San Diego
Japanese-American tennis players